Patricia Winifred Birnie (17 November 1926 - February 2013) was a British lawyer, and an internationally recognised expert on the law of the sea and the regulation of whaling.

Personal life and education
Birnie was born in Lytham St Annes, Lancashire, and attended Queen Mary School. She studied jurisprudence at St Hilda's College, Oxford and became a barrister in 1952. She later gained a PhD from the University of Edinburgh. Her thesis title was "Development of the international regulation of whaling : its relation to the emerging law of conservation of marine mammals".

She married Sandy (died 1982) in 1952; they had a son and two daughters.

Career

After working as a civil servant in the Treasury, Birnie moved to Scotland and taught law part-time at the universities of Aberdeen and Edinburgh before becoming a lecturer at Edinburgh. From 1983 to 1989 she taught at the London School of Economics.

Birnie was the first director of the  International Maritime Law Institute, established in Malta by the International Maritime Organization, from 1989 until her retirement in 1994.

Selected publications
 
4th edition published as 
 Based on her PhD thesis

References

1926 births
2013 deaths
English women lawyers
Alumni of St Hilda's College, Oxford
Alumni of the University of Edinburgh
Academics of the London School of Economics
Academics of the University of Edinburgh
20th-century English lawyers
20th-century English women
20th-century English people